Tân Dân may refer to:

Tân Dân, Bac Giang, Vietnam
Tân Dân, Ca Mau, Vietnam